Winkelman is a town in Gila and Pinal counties in Arizona, United States. According to the 2010 census, the population of the town was 353, all of whom lived in Gila County.

History
The community was named after Peter Winkelman, a local cattleman.

Geography
Winkelman is located at the southern tip of Gila County at  (32.988142, -110.770240). Winkelman is adjacent to Hayden. The unincorporated community of Dudleyville is south of Winkelman, in Pinal County.

The Gila River passes along the eastern and southern sides of town.

Demographics

At the 2000 census, there were 443 people, 160 households, and 112 families living in the town. The racial makeup of the town was 62.1% White, 0.2% Black or African American, 36.1% from other races, and 1.6% from two or more races. 74.7% of the population were Hispanic or Latino of any race.

Of the 160 households 30.6% had children under the age of 18 living with them, 46.9% were married couples living together, 15.6% had a female householder with no husband present, and 29.4% were non-families. 26.3% of households were one person and 11.9% were one person aged 65 or older. The average household size was 2.77 and the average family size was 3.35.

The age distribution was 29.3% under the age of 18, 9.9% from 18 to 24, 21.2% from 25 to 44, 25.1% from 45 to 64, and 14.4% 65 or older. The median age was 37 years. For every 100 females, there were 95.2 males. For every 100 females age 18 and over, there were 92.0 males.

The median household income was $25,455 and the median family income was $38,250. Males had a median income of $34,583 versus $17,250 for females. The per capita income for the town was $10,506. About 20.0% of families and 27.2% of the population were below the poverty line, including 42.5% of those under age 18 and 16.7% of those age 65 or over.

Schools
Winkelman is home to Winkelman Elementary School and Hayden High School, located adjacent to each other and operated by the Hayden Winkelman Unified School District.

Notable person
 Alfredo Chavez Marquez, United States District Court judge, born in Winkelman

Images

See also

 List of cities and towns in Arizona
 Coolidge Dam#Flood of 1993

References

External links

  History of Winkelman (scroll down)

Towns in Gila County, Arizona
Towns in Pinal County, Arizona